Harry James Britter (23 June 1891 – 5 February 1954) was an Australian rules footballer who played with Melbourne and Geelong in the Victorian Football League (VFL). He served in the Australian Imperial Force in World War I, enlisting in July 1915.

Notes

External links 

Discovering Anzacs profile
Demonwiki profile

1891 births
1954 deaths
Australian rules footballers from Victoria (Australia)
Australian Rules footballers: place kick exponents
Melbourne Football Club players
Geelong Football Club players
Chilwell Football Club players
Australian military personnel of World War I